Mount Hope Plantation House is a historic plantation house located at 8151 Highland Road in Baton Rouge, Louisiana.

It was built in 1817 and it is the only farmhouse of its kind remaining in the Baton Rouge area.

The house was added to the National Register of Historic Places on December 3, 1980.

See also
National Register of Historic Places listings in East Baton Rouge Parish, Louisiana

References

Houses on the National Register of Historic Places in Louisiana
Houses completed in 1850
Houses in Baton Rouge, Louisiana
National Register of Historic Places in Baton Rouge, Louisiana